Henry Jones of Asthall Manor (died 1673), Oxfordshire was an officer in the New Model Army during the Interregnum. He transferred to the new small Royalist army of Charles II, serving as a Life Guard until he was dismissed after becoming a Roman Catholic. With King Charles's blessing he raised an English regiment of horse (cavalry) known as English Regiment of Light Horse in France for the French Army of Louis XIV. He was killed in action at the siege of Maastricht.

Early life
Henry Jones was the son of Rice Jones (died probably by 1644) and his wife Jane daughter of Giles Bray of Harrington.

Early military career

Jones was a captain in, or possibly was major of, John Humphrey's regiment of foot in Barbados and Jamaica in 1655 and 1656. He was lucky to survive service in the West Indies.

Battle of the Dunes
Jones and another officer, Colonel Drummond, accompanied Lord Fauconberg (a son-in-law of the Lord Protector Oliver Cromwell). Jones volunteered to join Sir William Lockhart's Brigade which fought alongside the French army at the siege of Dunkirk and at the Battle of the Dunes on 4 June 1658.

At the Battle of the Dunes Jones was attached to Lockhart's New Model Army regiment. The regiment was under the command of Lieutenant-Colonel Roger Fenwick when it attacked veteran Spanish soldiers ensconced on top of  dune (sand-hill). The sides of the dune were so steep that attacking English had to scramble up on hands and knees. The English, after two volleys and push of pike, drove the Spanish from the crest of the dune and then pursued them down the far side. They were then in turn attacked by Anglo-Spanish cavalry who were unable to break the English formation and were themselves then driven off by French cavalry. By then all the regimental officers were either dead, or wounded. Jones himself had been, shot through the shoulder and wounded in two other places, but this did not deter him from seizing a loose French cavalry horse and joining the French cavalry in the counter-attack on the Anglo-Spanish cavalry. However, Jones pursued the enemy too far and was captured.

Jones had displayed such valour in this action that on his release from a short captivity (he was part of a prisoner exchange), he was dubbed a knight bachelor by Oliver Cromwell on 17 July 1658 (this honour, like all Protectorate honours, passed into oblivion at the Restoration in May 1660), and was promoted to the lieutenant-colonelcy of John Hewson's infantry regiment.

Restoration
At the Restoration, he found his way into a lieutenant's commission in Lord Hawley's troop in the Royal Horse Guards, probably through the patronage and influence of George Monck and Sir William Lockhart. By 1665 he had risen to captain.

Recusancy
In September 1667, Parliament passed an act that forbade Roman Catholics from being officers in the English Army. On the 26th of that month, all Roman Catholics officers were dismissed. Charles II recognised that many of the dismissed officers, or their fathers, had been devoted to the Royalist cause during the English Civil War and Interregnum. Appreciative of the loyalty they had shown, he made arrangements for these officers to enter service of the French Army, in Sir George Hamilton's regiment. Jones was one of those who left England for service abroad - reportedly, he converted to Roman Catholicism some time before the act of Parliament.  He may have initially gone to Spain, but then became the lieutenant of Sir George Hamilton's Troop of English Gens d'Armes in the French army. However, he retained his troop in the Royal Horse Guards whilst in France.

Regiment of Light Horse, and death
In 1671 Jones obtained permission to expand the Gens d'Armes into a full-sized light cavalry regiment under his own command. The regiment known as Sir Henry Jones's Regiment of Light Horse or the English Regiment of Light Horse in France was about 500 strong. Jones was its first colonel and Ferdinando Lyttelton its first lieutenant-colonel. Jones tried to recruit men from his own troop in the  Royal Horse Guards; much to his annoyance, there were few volunteers. Jones was killed by a bullet through the throat whilst he was attending the Duke of Monmouth at the siege of Maastricht in 1673.

Family
Jones married Frances, daughter Henry Belasyse (1604–1647).

They had a daughter and sole heir: Frances (born March 1667), who married  Richard, Viscount Lumley.

Notes

References
 
 
 
 

 
 
 

 
 
 
 

Attribution

1673 deaths
English military personnel killed in action
Year of birth unknown
Royal Horse Guards officers
French Army officers
Converts to Roman Catholicism from Protestantism
New Model Army personnel